The WCPW Ladies Championship (also called the WCPW Women's Championship) was a women's professional wrestling championship in Windy City Pro Wrestling (WCPW). Originally, WCPW was known as Windy City Wrestling (WCW), however, a lawsuit brought by World Championship Wrestling forced the smaller promotion to change its name to "Windy City Pro Wrestling" in 1997. The championship remained active until December 2010, when WCPW merged with the Chicago Pro Wrestling Academy to form Dynasty Sports Entertainment. The women's title has the distinction for being the "most controversial" championship in the promotion with three former champions being stripped of the title while a fourth, Dymond, abandoned the title to join a rival promotion.

The inaugural champion was Candi Devine, who won the title at a live event in Chicago, Illinois on April 19, 1988 to become the first WCW Women's Champion. Lips Manson holds the record for most reigns, with three. "Awesome" Ondi Austin held the title four times, however, the promotion only officially recognizes two of her reigns. At 980 days, Cheeks Manson was the longest reigning champion in the title's history. Maria Maceli's second reign was the shortest in the history of the title lasting only 29 days. Overall, there have been 21 reigns shared between 32 wrestlers, with nine vacancies, and 1 deactivation.

Title history

Names

Reigns

Combined reigns

Notes

References

External links
WindyCityProWrestling.com
Title History - Windy City Pro Wrestling

Ladies Championship
Women's professional wrestling championships